The Central European Chamber Orchestra is a Vienna-based Chamber Orchestra founded in 2005. It came into being due to the enthusiasm and adventurous spirit of students. Many of the original young musicians have matured into excellent instrumentalists, committed composers, experienced arrangers, and promising conductors.

As the orchestra is composed of artists from various countries, and with different musical and educational backgrounds, it made it possible for the orchestra to have a great deal of flexibility in terms of its repertoire—classical-romantic repertoire, New Music and Jazz). The expertise of young "all-rounders" was used to the greatest extent possible. In addition to its work on pieces from the classical repertoire, the orchestra aims at establishing close co-operation with artists with backgrounds in the performing arts and visual arts, as well as with artists from the contemporary Viennese dance scene.

The mission of the orchestra is to establish itself as a regionally significant musical entity which does not see Vienna as its sole area of activity, but rather as an important regional centre, the focal point of a realm of Central European culture which transcends national borders. The Central European Chamber Orchestra has given two international guest performances in China, where the careful introduction of interesting, extravagant pieces, resonated well with the audience.

References

Austrian orchestras
Chamber orchestras
Musical groups established in 2005
2005 establishments in Austria